The Flandrau Science Center & Planetarium is a science museum and planetarium in Tucson, Arizona. It is part of the University of Arizona. It is named after American author Grace Flandrau. The Eos Planetarium Theater has a  15.2 meter dome and seats 146 people. The science center includes fossil and mineral exhibits.

The minor planet 18368 Flandrau is named after this center.

History
The center was founded using a donation from the estate of American author Grace Flandrau. The university Board of Regents approved its creation in 1972 and the center first opened its doors in 1975. O. Richard Norton was its first director.

The planetarium originally used a star projector for its shows, which was nicknamed the "Hector Vector Star Projector". The star projector was replaced by newer technology. In 2017, renovations of the planetarium were completed and it was reopened under a new name, the "Eos Foundation Planetarium Theater".

See also

List of planetariums

References

External links
 Official website

Planetaria in the United States
University of Arizona
Museums established in 1972